This is a list of properties and districts in Atkinson County, Georgia that are listed on the National Register of Historic Places (NRHP).

Current listings

|}

References

Atkinson
Atkinson County, Georgia
National Register of Historic Places in Atkinson County, Georgia